1841 in archaeology

Explorations

Excavations
 Kyriakos Pittakis carries out the first excavations at Mycenae.

Publications 
 Biblical Researches in Palestine, the Sinai, Petrae and Adjacent Regions by Edward Robinson, based on his survey conducted over several years, proposes identification of Biblical names with modern sites.
 Incidents of Travel in Central America, Chiapas, and Yucatan by John Lloyd Stephens, illustrated by Frederick Catherwood, provides much more accurate information on the ruins of the Maya civilization than previous publications and generates international interest in the subject.

Births

Alexander Stuart Murray - Scottish archaeologist and museum curator (died 1904)

Deaths

See also
 List of years in archaeology
 1840 in archaeology
 1842 in archaeology

References

1841 archaeological discoveries
Archaeology by year
Archaeology